This is a partial list of the described species of the harvestman family Cranaidae. The data is taken from Joel Hallan's Biology Catalog.

Cranainae
Cranainae Roewer, 1913

 Atonocranaus Mello-Leitão, 1935
 Aguaytiella Goodnight & Goodnight, 1943
 Aguaytiella maculata Goodnight & Goodnight, 1943 — Peru

 Alausius Roewer, 1932
 Alausius mirus Roewer, 1932 — Ecuador

 Allocranaus Roewer, 1915
 Allocranaus colombianus Roewer, 1915 — Colombia

 Angistrisoma Roewer, 1932
 Angistrisoma atrolutea Roewer, 1932 — Ecuador
 Angistrisoma fusca Roewer, 1932 — Ecuador

 Angistrius Roewer, 1932
 Angistrius abnormis Roewer, 1932 — Ecuador

 Aucayacuella S. Avram & H. E. M. Soares, 1983
 Aucayacuella bordoni S. Avram, 1983 — Peru

 Balzabamba Mello-Leitão, 1945
 Balzabamba marmorata Mello-Leitão, 1945 — Ecuador

 Baustomus Roewer, 1932
 Baustomus macrospina Roewer, 1932 — Ecuador

 Bucayana Mello-Leitão, 1942
 Bucayana bucayana Mello-Leitão, 1942 — Ecuador

 Bunicranaus Roewer, 1913
 Bunicranaus simoni Roewer, 1913 — Ecuador

 Callcosma Roewer, 1932
 Callcosma gracilima Roewer, 1932 — Ecuador

 Carsevennia Roewer, 1913
 Carsevennia crassipalpis Roewer, 1913 — French Guiana

 Cayabeus Roewer, 1932
 Cayabeus perlatus Roewer, 1932 — Ecuador

 Cenipa Goodnight & Goodnight, 1943
 Cenipa nubila Goodnight & Goodnight, 1943 — Peru

 Chetronus Roewer, 1932
 Chetronus spiniger Roewer, 1932 — Ecuador

 Clinocippus Roewer, 1932
 Clinocippus albater Roewer, 1932 — Ecuador

 Comboyus Roewer, 1943
 Comboyus albilineatus Roewer, 1943 — Panama

 Cranaus Simon, 1879
 Cranaus albipustulatus Roewer, 1943 — Colombia
 Cranaus bilunatus Roewer, 1913 — Ecuador
 Cranaus chlorogaster (Gervais, 1844) — Colombia
 Cranaus cinnamomeus (Gervais, 1844) — Colombia
 Cranaus filipes (Roewer, 1917) — Ecuador
 Cranaus flaviaculeatus (Caporiacco, 1951) — Venezuela
 Cranaus hickmanni (Caporiacco, 1951) — Venezuela
 Cranaus injucundus (Wood, 1869) — Ecuador
 Cranaus praedo (Wood, 1869) — Ecuador
 Cranaus spinipalpus (Wood, 1869) — Ecuador

 Deriacrus Roewer, 1932
 Deriacrus marginatus Roewer, 1963 — Colombia
 Deriacrus simoni Roewer, 1932 — Colombia, Ecuador

 Digalistes Roewer, 1932
 Digalistes signata Roewer, 1932 — Brazil

 Diptyonius Roewer, 1932
 Diptyonius striatus Roewer, 1932 — Ecuador

 Eucranaus Roewer, 1913
 Eucranaus fuscus (Roewer, 1932) — Venezuela
 Eucranaus reticulatus Roewer, 1913 — Ecuador
 Eucranaus tenuipes (Roewer, 1959) — Ecuador

 Guayaquiliana Mello-Leitão, 1935
 Guayaquiliana camposi Mello-Leitão, 1935 — Ecuador

 Holocranaus Roewer, 1913
 Holocranaus albimarginis Goodnight & Goodnight, 1943 — Peru
 Holocranaus angulus Roewer, 1932 — Ecuador
 Holocranaus bordoni (Avram & Soares, 1979) — Venezuela
 Holocranaus calcar (Roewer, 1912) — Colombia
 Holocranaus calus (Goodnight & Goodnight, 1944) — Colombia
 Holocranaus conspicuus Roewer, 1932 — Ecuador
 Holocranaus laevifrons Roewer, 1917 — Ecuador
 Holocranaus longipes Roewer, 1913 — Colombia
 Holocranaus luteimarginatus Roewer, 1917 — Ecuador
 Holocranaus pectinitibialis (Roewer, 1914) — Colombia
 Holocranaus rugosus Roewer, 1932 — Ecuador
 Holocranaus simplex Roewer, 1913 — Colombia

 Homocranaus Roewer, 1915
 Homocranaus tetracalcar Roewer, 1915 — Colombia

 Idomenta Roewer, 1932
 Idomenta luteipalpis Roewer, 1932 — Brazil

 Isocranaus Roewer, 1915
 Isocranaus gorgonae Hirst, 1926 — Colombia
 Isocranaus obscurus Roewer, 1915 — Colombia, Ecuador
 Isocranaus reticulatus Roewer, 1959 — Ecuador
 Isocranaus umbraticus Roewer, 1959 — Ecuador

 Kendima Roewer, 1932
 Kendima albiornata Roewer, 1932 — Ecuador

 Ladantola Roewer, 1932
 Ladantola aspersa (Roewer, 1932) — Brazil

 Mecritta Roewer, 1932
 Mecritta filipes Roewer, 1932 — Brazil

 Megacranaus Roewer, 1913
 Megacranaus areolatus Roewer, 1932 — Colombia
 Megacranaus pygoplus Roewer, 1913 — Colombia

 Metacranaus Roewer, 1913
 Metacranaus tricalcaris Roewer, 1913 — Colombia

 Microcranaus Roewer, 1913
 Microcranaus colombianus Roewer, 1963 — Colombia
 Microcranaus pustulatus Roewer, 1913 — Ecuador

 Neocranaus Roewer, 1913
 Neocranaus albiconspersus Roewer, 1913 — Venezuela
 Neocranaus armatissimus (Mello-Leitão, 1941) —Colombia
 Neocranaus dybasi (Goodnight & Goodnight, 1947) — Colombia

 Panalus Goodnight & Goodnight, 1947
 Panalus robustus Goodnight & Goodnight, 1947 — Colombia

 Paracranaus Roewer, 1913
 Paracranaus crassipalpis Roewer, 1913 — Colombia

 Parkocranaus Mello-Leitão, 1949
 Parkocranaus bimaculatus Mello-Leitão, 1949

 Peripa Roewer, 1925
 Peripa clavipus Roewer, 1925 — Ecuador
 Peripa simplex Roewer, 1932 — Colombia

 Phalangodus Gervais, 1842
 Phalangodus anacosmetus Gervais, 1842 — Colombia
 Phalangodus poecilis (Roewer, 1943) — Peru

 Phareicranaus Roewer, 1913
 Phareicranaus albigranulatus Roewer, 1913 — Colombia
 Phareicranaus albigyratus Roewer, 1932 — Colombia
 Phareicranaus albilineatus Roewer, 1932 — Venezuela
 Phareicranaus albimedialis (Goodnight & Goodnight, 1943) — Peru
 Phareicranaus calcariferus (Simon, 1879) — Colombia, Trinidad
 Phareicranaus cingulatus Roewer, 1932 — Bolivia
 Phareicranaus festae Roewer, 1925 — Ecuador
 Phareicranaus giganteus Roewer, 1932 — Chile, Colombia
 Phareicranaus magnus (Roewer, 1932) —  Panama
 Phareicranaus marcuzzi Caporiacco, 1951 — Venezuela
 Phareicranaus ornatus Roewer, 1932 — Panama, Costa Rica
 Phareicranaus parallelus Roewer, 1925 — Ecuador
 Phareicranaus x-albus Roewer, 1925 — Ecuador
 Phareicranaus angelica Roewer, 1963 — Colombia
 Phareicranaus arthrocentricus (Mello-Leitão, 1943) — Ecuador
 Phareicranaus calcarfemoralis (Roewer, 1917) — Venezuela
 Phareicranaus calcartibialis (Roewer, 1915) — Venezuela
 Phareicranaus circumlineatus M. A. González-Sponga, 1989 — Venezuela
 Phareicranaus curvipes (Roewer, 1916) — Venezuela
 Phareicranaus duranti M. A. González-Sponga, 1989 — Venezuela
 Phareicranaus festae (Roewer, 1925) — Ecuador
 Phareicranaus giganteus (Roewer, 1913) — Ecuador
 Phareicranaus heliae S. Avram, 1983 — Venezuela
 Phareicranaus magnus Goodnight & Goodnight, 1942 — Guyana
 Phareicranaus manauara R. Pinto-da-Rocha, 1994 — Brazil
 Phareicranaus ortizi Roewer, 1952 — Peru
 Phareicranaus singularis (H. Soares, 1970)
 Phareicranaus spinulatus Goodnight & Goodnight, 1943 — Colombia

 Puna Roewer, 1925
 Puna festae Roewer, 1925 — Ecuador
 Puna semicircularis Roewer, 1932 — Ecuador

 Quindina Roewer, 1914
 Quindina bella Roewer, 1914 — Colombia
 Quindina bimaculata Roewer, 1932

 Sibundoxia Roewer, 1963
 Sibundoxia scripta Roewer, 1963 — Colombia

 Spinicranaus Roewer, 1913
 Spinicranaus camposi (Mello-Leitão, 1942) — Ecuador
 Spinicranaus diabolicus (Simon, 1879) — Ecuador

 Spirunius Roewer, 1932
 Spirunius coxipunctus Roewer, 1932 — Ecuador

 Stygnicranella Caporiacco, 1951
 Stygnicranella pizai Caporiacco, 1951 — Venezuela

 Tetracranaus Roewer, 1963
 Tetracranaus zilchi Roewer, 1963 — Colombia

 Thaumatocranaus Roewer, 1932
 Thaumatocranaus mirabilis Roewer, 1932 — Ecuador

 Timotesa Roewer, 1943
 Timotesa octomaculata Roewer, 1943 — Venezuela

 Tripilatus Roewer, 1932
 Tripilatus elegans Roewer, 1932 — Bolivia

 Ventrifurca Roewer, 1913
 Ventrifurca albipustulata Roewer, 1913 — Colombia

 Ventripila Roewer, 1917
 Ventripila marginata Roewer, 1917 — Ecuador

 Ventrisudis Roewer, 1963
 Ventrisudis mira Roewer, 1963 — Colombia

 Ventrivomer Roewer, 1913
 Ventrivomer ancyrophorus (Butler, 1873) — Ecuador, Bolivia

Heterocranainae
Heterocranainae Roewer, 1913

 Heterocranaus Roewer, 1913
 Heterocranaus lutescens (Roewer, 1919) — Ecuador
 Heterocranaus margaritipalpis (Simon, 1879) — Ecuador, Colombia

Prostygninae
Prostygninae Roewer, 1913

 Binamballeus Roewer, 1952
 Binamballeus metatarsalis Roewer, 1952 — Peru

 Chiriboga Roewer, 1959
 Chiriboga albituber Roewer, 1959 — Ecuador

 Cutervolus Roewer, 1957
 Cutervolus albopunctatus Roewer, 1957 — Peru

 Globibunus Roewer, 1912
 Globibunus rubrofemoratus Roewer, 1912 — Ecuador

 Globitarsus Roewer, 1913
 Globitarsus angustus Roewer, 1913 — Colombia

 Lisarea Roewer, 1943
 Lisarea ferruginea Roewer, 1943 — Ecuador

 Meridanatus Roewer, 1943
 Meridanatus berlandi Roewer, 1943 — Venezuela

 Micropachylus Roewer, 1913
 Micropachylus metatarsalis Roewer, 1913 — Colombia

 Peladoius Roewer, 1919
 Peladoius riveti Roewer, 1919 — Ecuador

 Prostygnellus Roewer, 1919
 Prostygnellus isabellinus (Roewer, 1943) — Ecuador
 Prostygnellus riveti Roewer, 1919 — Ecuador

 Prostignidius Roewer, 1915
 Prostignidius pustulatus Roewer, 1915 — Colombia

 Prostygnus Roewer, 1913
 Prostygnus vestitus Roewer, 1913 — Colombia

 Sclerostygnellus Roewer, 1943
 Sclerostygnellus rotundus Roewer, 1943 — Colombia

 Troya Roewer, 1919
 Troya riveti Roewer, 1919 — Ecuador

 Yania Roewer, 1919
 Yania flavolimbata Roewer, 1919 — Ecuador
 Yania metatarsalis A. B. Kury, 1994 — Ecuador

Stygnicranainae
Stygnicranainae Roewer, 1913
 Agathocranaus Orrico & Kury, 2009
 Agathocranaus innocens Orrico & Kury, 2009 — Ecuador

 Stygnicranaus Roewer, 1913
 Stygnicranaus abnormis Roewer, 1913 — Colombia
 Stygnicranaus alessandroi Orrico & Kury, 2009 — Colombia
 Stygnicranaus concolor Kury, 1995 — Colombia
 Stygnicranaus poncedeleoni Orrico & Kury, 2009 — Colombia

 Tryferos Roewer, 1931
 Tryferos elegans Roewer, 1931 — Ecuador

References
 Joel Hallan's Biology Catalog: Cranaidae

Cranaidae
Cranaidae